Pine Ridge at Crestwood is an unincorporated community and census-designated place (CDP) located within Manchester Township, in Ocean County, New Jersey, United States. As of the 2010 United States Census, the CDP's population was 2,369.

Geography
According to the United States Census Bureau, the Pine Ridge at Crestwood CDP had a total area of 1.736 square miles (4.497 km2), including 1.728 square miles (4.475 km2) of land and 0.008 square miles (0.022 km2) of water (0.48%).

Demographics

Census 2010

Census 2000
As of the 2000 United States Census there were 2,025 people, 1,367 households, and 567 families living in the CDP. The population density was 457.2/km2 (1,181.1/mi2). There were 1,514 housing units at an average density of 341.8/km2 (883.0/mi2). The racial makeup of the CDP was 98.77% White, 0.49% African American, 0.05% Native American, 0.25% Asian, and 0.44% from two or more races. Hispanic or Latino of any race were 0.79% of the population.

There were 1,367 households, out of which none had children under the age of 18 living with them, 34.8% were married couples living together, 5.6% had a female householder with no husband present, and 58.5% were non-families. 55.4% of all households were made up of individuals, and 48.3% had someone living alone who was 65 years of age or older. The average household size was 1.48 and the average family size was 2.07.

In the CDP the population was spread out, with 0.2% under the age of 18, 0.4% from 18 to 24, 2.2% from 25 to 44, 17.7% from 45 to 64, and 79.5% who were 65 years of age or older. The median age was 75 years. For every 100 females, there were 62.4 males. For every 100 females age 18 and over, there were 62.3 males.

The median income for a household in the CDP was $22,019, and the median income for a family was $27,750. Males had a median income of $16,094 versus $31,071 for females. The per capita income for the CDP was $20,320. About 5.7% of families and 5.7% of the population were below the poverty line, including none of those under age 18 and 5.2% of those age 65 or over.

References

Census-designated places in Ocean County, New Jersey
Manchester Township, New Jersey
Populated places in the Pine Barrens (New Jersey)